Río abajo is a 1960 Argentine film directed by Enrique Dawi.

Cast

External links
 

1960 films
1960s Spanish-language films
Argentine black-and-white films
Films directed by Enrique Dawi
Argentine documentary films
1960s Argentine films